Yelkhovetsky is a rural locality (a village) in Krasnopolyanskoye Rural Settlement, Nikolsky District, Vologda Oblast, Russia. The population was 6 as of 2002.

Geography 
The distance to Nikolsk is 31 km. Polezhayevo is the nearest rural locality.

References 

Rural localities in Nikolsky District, Vologda Oblast